Longford is the county town of County Longford in Ireland. It has a population of 10,008 according to the 2016 census. It is the biggest town in the county and about one third of the county's population lives there. Longford lies at the meeting of Ireland's N4 and N5 National Primary Route roads, which means that traffic travelling between Dublin and County Mayo, or north County Roscommon passes around the town. Longford railway station, on the Dublin-Sligo line, is used heavily by commuters.

History
The town is built at a fording point on the banks of the River Camlin, which is a tributary of the River Shannon. According to several sources, the name Longford is an Anglicization of the Irish , referring to a fortress or fortified house.

A Dominican priory was founded there in 1400. St. John's Church of Ireland (formerly known as Templemichael Parish Church) was built on the site of the priory in 1710.

Places of interest
Located to the south of Longford, in Keenagh, is the visitor centre of the Corlea Trackway. There are also a number of portal dolmens located around Longford.

The town serves as the cathedral town of the Roman Catholic Diocese of Ardagh and Clonmacnoise. St Mel's Cathedral, dedicated to Saint Mel, the founder of the diocese of Ardagh, was built between 1840 and 1856. It was designed by architect John Benjamin Keane, who also designed St Francis Xavier's Church on Gardiner Street in Dublin. St Mel's Cathedral features several stained glass windows by Harry Clarke studios. These include one of Clarke's earliest works, The consecration of St. Mel as Bishop of Longford, which was exhibited at the RDS Annual Art Industries Exhibition in 1910, where it received second prize. The cathedral was extensively damaged in a fire on Christmas Day 2009. It remained closed for five years after the fire, while it was the centre of one of the largest restoration projects undertaken in Europe. It reopened for services at midnight mass on Christmas Eve 2014 and has since become a tourist attraction. Two of the intricate stained-glass windows in the transepts of the cathedral, depicting St Anne and the Resurrection, have been restored.

Longford town has a 212-seat theatre called Backstage Theatre just outside of the town, and a four-screen multiplex cinema, with restaurants. The Irish Prison Service HQ, which is in the Lisamuck area of the town, has a sculpture by artist Remco de Fouw, which is one of the largest pieces of sculpture in Ireland.

In a 2003 Guardian article about Patrick McCabe, Longford's "features of distinction" are described as including "a hulking cathedral, a rash of fast-food joints, a grubby cinema and a shopping mall".

Economy

Longford's main industries are food production, sawmills, steelworking, generator retailing, cable making and the production of medical diagnostics. It is the major services centre for the county as well as the location of the Department of Social Welfare and the Irish Prison Service. The town is also a local commercial centre, with a number of retail outlets including multiples such as Tesco, and Argos, German discount retailers, Aldi and Lidl and Irish retail outlets such as Dunnes Stores and Penneys. A retail park, the N4 Axis Centre, opened in Longford in January 2006.

Longford town has a decentralized government department which employs approximately 300 people, and a further 130 are employed at the Irish Prison Service's headquarters in the town. Connolly Barracks once employed approximately 180 soldiers, many of whom were involved in UN peace-keeping duties, until the barracks closed in January 2009.

While construction was formerly a major local employer, following the post-2008 Irish economic downturn, there were job losses in the construction industry and an increase in unemployment in the region.

Education
Longford town has a number of primary schools (for ages 4–12) and three secondary schools (for ages 12–19): two single-sex schools, St. Mel's College (a Catholic boys' school), and Scoil Mhuire (a Catholic girls' school run by the Sisters of Mercy), as well as a mixed school, (Templemichael College, formerly known as Longford Vocational School). Primary schools in Longford include a Gaelscoil and St. Joseph's. There is also an adult education centre in Longford.

St. Mel's College is the oldest of these schools, being founded in the 1860s by the Roman Catholic Bishop of Ardagh and Clonmacnois as a diocesan seminary to train students for the priesthood. While the school only briefly functioned as a seminary, it served for many years as a boarding school, while also admitting day students. The boarding school was discontinued after 2000 and the school is now only a day school, with the largest student enrolment in County Longford.

Transport

Road
Longford is at the point of divergence of the N5 road to Castlebar/Westport/Ireland West Airport Knock and the N4 road which continues onwards to Sligo.

The N5 originally started in the town centre, causing occasional traffic congestion. The town's bypass opened on 3 August 2012.

The N4 Sligo road has a bypass around the town, which consists of single carriageway with hard shoulders and four roundabouts. It was opened on 2 June 1995.

Rail
Longford railway station (opened 8 November 1855) is on the Dublin-Sligo line of the Irish railway network. Despite its distance from Dublin, there is a regular, well-utilised commuter service to Dublin with journeys to Dublin Connolly generally taking about an hour and three-quarters.

Canals
The Royal Canal reopened in October 2010 after years of being derelict and overgrown. Navigation is now possible from Spencer Dock, in Dublin, to the Shannon, in Clondra.

Bus
There are a number of bus services to Dublin and other towns both outside and inside the county provided by both the state (Bus Éireann) and private bus companies (Kane's, Donnelly's and Farrelly's.) Third level colleges are also served by the private companies during the academic year.

Donnelly's Pioneer Bus Service, a local bus company based in Granard, operate a route from Longford to Granard via Ballinalee. There are three journeys each way daily (no Sunday service).

Whartons Travel, which is also a local bus service, operate a route from Longford railway station and Longford to Cavan via Drumlish, Arvagh and Crossdoney. As of 2014, this service is funded by the National Transport Authority.

Air
Longford's main air transport centre is located south-east of the town, at Abbeyshrule. Abbeyshrule Aerodrome receives a regular influx of small general aviation aircraft, including the Cessna 182 and 150. The airport also has two flight training centres; one for general aviation fixed wing aircraft training (Aeroclub 2000) and one for microlight aircraft flight training (Ultraflight).

Arts and culture
The Backstage Theatre and Centre for the Arts is a facility for arts and culture projects in the town and surrounding areas. It is funded by Longford County Council with support from the Arts Council. Backstage is a member of two arts touring networks: Nasc a nationwide network of seven venues and Nomad a north midlands based network.

Sport
The town has a number of sports clubs and facilities, including the Gaelic Athletic Association, rugby and tennis clubs, a League of Ireland soccer club, two indoor swimming pools, a gym and an 18-hole golf course. A swimming pool was opened in Longford in 2007.

Gaelic football and hurling
The sport with most support in County Longford is Gaelic football. The headquarters of the Longford Gaelic Athletic Association is located in Pearse Park in Longford Town, with a ground capacity of around 11,000. The Longford Gaelic football team won a Leinster title at Senior level in 1968 and a National League title in 1966. The minor (under-18) Longford county team won the Leinster title in 2002 and 2010. The major boys' secondary school in Longford town, St. Mel's College, also has a tradition in secondary schools' football (known as Colleges A), winning 29 Leinster and 4 All-Ireland titles (in the Hogan Cup). The main local GAA club is Longford Slashers, based in Longford town, who have won more Longford Senior Football Championship titles (16) than any other team in the county, including a win in 2013.

Soccer
Longford town itself has a strong tradition in soccer, the game being introduced in the late 19th century. The town was a military base garrison when Ireland was a part of the United Kingdom. Longford Town football club was founded in 1924 and was elected to the League of Ireland in 1984. In the 1950s and 60s, Longford was home to players such as Willie Browne (UCD and Bohemian FC; who won 3 full international Republic of Ireland caps and captained Bohemian FC for 3 consecutive seasons), Lal Donlon (Longford town and Arsenal), Mel 'Garrincha' Mulligan, John 'Hooky' O'Connor and Billy Clarke. The Longford Town football club ground is at City Calling Stadium, in the townland of Mullolagher, to the west of the town, on the Strokestown Road. Previously, the club was based in the north of Abbeycarton town. The Longford Town football club has twice won the FAI Cup, in 2003 and 2004, and has competed in the UEFA Cup as a result.

Other sports
Longford has a parkland golf course.

Longford is represented in basketball by two clubs. Torpedo's were formed in 1973 and have competed in the Meath, Cavan, Mid-lands and National leagues. They now play in the Shannon Side League in Men's and North East League in Ladies'. Ladies and Men's teams play home games in Edgeworthstown. They hold an annual tournament at the end September start of October each season with 16 teams from all over Ireland and the UK entering. The second club which was a break away unit of the Torpedo's are Longford Falcons. The club has had a number of Leinster and national titles won at the junior level. The club is based at the Mall Sports Complex, in the east of the town.

Longford town also hosts a rugby club, Longford RFC, whose grounds are located at Demesne, in the north of the town, and who participate in the Leinster League.

Longford's largest sports complex/amenity, known locally as The Mall, contains a swimming pool, gym, both indoor and outdoor football and basketball grounds. There is also outdoor gym equipment around the complex.

People
Willie Browne, (1936–2004), Republic of Ireland international footballer
Francis "Frank" Butler, (1847–1926), famed rifleshot who toured the US (1876–1884), and husband-manager of American sharpshooter Annie Oakley
Padraic Colum, (1881–1972), Irish poet, novelist and playwright
Ray Flynn, (born 1957), Irish mile record holder
Michael Gomez, (born 1977), champion professional boxer was born in an Irish Traveller family in Longford.
Patrick McCabe, (born 1955) novelist, has lived in Longford.
Ruairí Ó Brádaigh, (1932–2013), Irish Republican and founder of Republican Sinn Féin

Climate
Climate in this area has mild differences between highs and lows, and there is adequate rainfall year-round.  The Köppen Climate Classification subtype for this climate is "Cfb" (Marine West Coast Climate/Oceanic climate).

See also
 Carn Clonhugh
 List of towns and villages in Ireland

References

External links
 
 

 
County towns in the Republic of Ireland
Towns and villages in County Longford